The Baihua Park is a public park in the City of Jinan, Shandong Province, China. The park covers an area of approximately 180,000 square meters, of which about 82% are covered with plantings. The main divisions of the park are: hundred flower spring viewing area (百花泉景区), landscape garden (山水园), peony garden (牡丹园), peony mountain (牡丹山), and aloe garden (芦花区). After a renovation that started in March 2010, the park was reopened on October 1, 2010. The Baihua park is located immediately next to the Tomb of Min Ziqian and it was formerly known as "Catkins Park" in a reference to the story about Min Ziqian's exemplary filial piety.

See also
Tomb of Min Ziqian
List of sites in Jinan

Urban public parks